Dmitri Aleksandrovich Chernykh (born February 27, 1985) is a Russian former professional ice hockey forward who played in the Kontinental Hockey League (KHL). He was drafted 48th overall in the 2003 NHL Entry Draft by the New York Islanders and is the son of former Soviet hockey player Alexander Chernykh.

Chernykh developed in the Khimik Voskresensk hockey system, the club his father also played for. He was a member of Russia's U18 national team, but struggled to make the U20 squad in the following years. Chernykh has primarily spent time skating in Russia's second- and third-tier leagues, struggling to break back into the KHL.

He played one season of hockey in North America for the Dayton Bombers during the 2006–07 season before returning to Russia.

Career statistics

Regular season and playoffs

International

References

External links

1985 births
Dayton Bombers players
HC CSKA Moscow players
HC Khimik Voskresensk players
HC Lada Togliatti players
HC Mechel players
HC Neftekhimik Nizhnekamsk players
HC Spartak Moscow players
Living people
Metallurg Novokuznetsk players
New York Islanders draft picks
Russian ice hockey right wingers
Salavat Yulaev Ufa players
People from Voskresensk
Sportspeople from Moscow Oblast